Healaugh  is a village and civil parish in the Selby District of North Yorkshire, England. According to the 2001 census it had a population of 161 in 63 households. The population had increased to 249 at the 2011 census. The village is about three miles north north-east of Tadcaster.

History
Healaugh Park Priory was established near the village at the site now called Healaugh Manor Farm. It was founded in 1218 by Jordan de Santa Maria and his wife, Alice, who was the granddaughter of Bertram Haget. Haget had previously granted the lands outside the village for a hermitage to  Gilbert, a monk of Marmoutier. It was finally dissolved in 1535. After the dissolution, it served as the Manor house, amongst whose owners were Sir Arthur D'Arcy and Thomas Wharton, 1st Baron Wharton.

Governance
The village lies within the Selby & Ainsty Parliamentary constituency. It is also within the Escrick Electoral Division of the North Yorkshire County Council and the Appleton Roebuck Ward of Selby District Council.

The civil parish is a joint parish with nearby Catterton. The joint Parish council has five members, four of which represent the village.

Geography
The parish covers an area of 3,378 acres of which the village occupies 2,666 acres. A short distance to the east of the village is Dam Dyke which flows via Catterton Beck and The Foss into the River Wharfe near Bolton Percy.

Religion
There is a church, dedicated to St John the Evangelist, which was built in Norman times. The vicar Charles Voysey was deprived of the living in 1871 for his heterodox views.

Notable people
Thomas Wharton, 1st Baron Wharton  (1495 – 23 August 1568) - resident, buried in the village
John Parker (Whig politician) (21 October 1799 – 5 September 1881) - buried in the village
Mark Westaby (born 17 April 1965), British strongman competitor - born in the village

Gallery

References

External links

Villages in North Yorkshire
Civil parishes in North Yorkshire
Selby District